Bessemer is an unincorporated community in Botetourt County, Virginia, United States. It was the birthplace of labor leader Frank Fairfax.

References

Unincorporated communities in Botetourt County, Virginia
Unincorporated communities in Virginia